The 2012 All-Ireland Minor Camogie Championship is an inter-county competition for age graded development squad county teams in the women's team field sport of camogie was won by Galway, who defeated Klkenny by five points in the final, played at Nenagh.

Arrangements
Holders Tipperary were defeated by Galway in a replayed semi-final. Kilkenny defeated Cork 1–10 to 1–5 in a dour semi-final clash at a windy Ballyagran on the Cork/Limerick border.

The Final
Kilkenny led by 1–6 to 1–2 at half time in the final and should have been further ahead. Rachel Monaghan's 43rd-minute goal decided the game. Player of the match was won by two-goal heroine Rachel Monaghan. Michaela Kenneally was selected as Player Of The Championship.

B Division
The Minor B final was won by Derry who defeated EWexford 2–16 to 2–5 in the final. Derry led by ten points at half time. Bronagh McGillion was named player of the match. The Minor C final was won by Kerry or Down.Kerry defeated Westmeath 4–8  to 2-0 and Down  defeated Laois  2–15 to 3–6 in the semi-finals.

Final stages

Lorraine Long (Piltown)

References

External links
 Camogie Association

Minor
All-Ireland Minor Camogie Championship